New Liberals may refer to:

 The New Liberals, an Australian political party 
 New Liberals (Germany)
 Party of New Liberals, Greek party, active 1977-1978

See also
 New Liberalism (Colombia)